Police Station No. 6 is a registered historic building in the East End neighborhood of Cincinnati, Ohio, listed in the National Register on May 18, 1981. The former patrol station of the Cincinnati Police Department was designed by Samuel Hannaford & Sons and completed in 1896.

Since 1981, it has housed Jeff Ruby's Precinct steakhouse.

Notes 

National Register of Historic Places in Cincinnati
Buildings and structures in Cincinnati
Samuel Hannaford buildings
Government buildings on the National Register of Historic Places in Ohio
Police stations on the National Register of Historic Places